John M. Pickard (June 25, 1913 – August 4, 1993) was an American actor who appeared primarily in television westerns.

Early life
Pickard was born in Lascassas in Rutherford County, near Murfreesboro in Middle Tennessee. He graduated from the Nashville Conservatory in Nashville, Tennessee. His first acting roles were small parts in films, mostly uncredited, beginning in 1936 as a dueling soldier in the picture Mary of Scotland, based on the 16th century queen, Mary of Scotland.

From 1942 to 1946, Pickard served in the United States Navy, having been the model for naval recruitment posters during World War II.

Career

Pickard returned to acting after the war and appeared in supporting roles in scores of westerns and action dramas before landing the starring role in the syndicated television series, Boots and Saddles, set on an Arizona fort in the late 19th century. His second film role, also uncredited, came in John Wayne's Wake of the Red Witch (1948).

Pickard's first television guest-starring roles were in crime dramas in 1951 and 1952, respectively -- Racket Squad, with Reed Hadley, and Boston Blackie. In 1954, he guest starred on the legal drama, The Public Defender, again with Reed Hadley. He was also cast on the syndicated western anthology series, Stories of the Century, with Jim Davis, and later on Davis' other series, Rescue 8, based on stories of the Los Angeles County Fire Department. Pickard appeared on Hopalong Cassidy and in 1956 on the CBS children's western My Friend Flicka. That same year he was cast in another  anthology series, Navy Log, and in an episode of Jack Webb's NBC series, Dragnet. He appeared in a 1956 episode of the TV series The Lone Ranger entitled "Trouble at Tylerville".

From 1957 to 1958, he filled the lead role of Captain Shank Adams on Boots and Saddles, with episodes set in the Arizona Territory on a United States Army fort. Afterwards, Pickard guest starred in many more westerns including the role of the gunfighter Johnny Ringo on The Life and Legend of Wyatt Earp, starring Hugh O'Brian as Wyatt Earp. Pickard also appeared as Derr in the series Official Detective 1958 episode "The Policeman's Gun". 

Other appearances were on Tales of the Texas Rangers, Dick Powell's Zane Grey Theatre, Yancy Derringer, Wagon Train, Johnny Ringo, Tales of Wells Fargo, The Texan, The Rebel, Laramie, The Rifleman, Empire, Rawhide, The Wild Wild West, and The Virginian. From 1960 to 1975, he appeared in twelve episodes of the long-running CBS western, Gunsmoke, with James Arness, who in 1955 had beaten out Pickard for the series lead as Marshal Matt Dillon.

In 1959, Pickard was cast, uncredited, as a Mississippi River pirate in the episode "The Unwilling" of the NBC western series, Riverboat, starring Darren McGavin and Burt Reynolds. In the story line, businessman Dan Simpson, played by Eddie Albert, attempts to open a general store in the American West despite a raid from river pirates who stole from him $20,000 in merchandise. Debra Paget is cast in this episode as Lela Russell, and Russell Johnson, as Darius. 

In 1961, Pickard had brief recurring role of Sergeant Major Murdock in the short-lived CBS western Gunslinger, starring Tony Young.

In addition to roles in westerns, Pickard also guest starred in several dramatic series. He made four appearances on Perry Mason, all as law-enforcement officials.  Other television series' include 
Lassie, The Twilight Zone, Ben Casey, Ironside, Mission: Impossible, and Cannon.

In 1969, he appeared as Frank Ross in another John Wayne film, True Grit. Pickard's final on-screen appearances was in a 1987 episode of the CBS detective series, Simon and Simon.

Death
On August 4, 1993, Pickard, at the age of 80, was killed by a bull on the family farm in Rutherford County, Tennessee. He was survived by his wife, Ann M. Pickard, and one adult child, three grandchildren and numerous great-grandchildren. His interment was at his family cemetery in Lascassas.

Selected filmography

Wake of the Red Witch (1948) - Second Diver (uncredited)
City Across the River (1949) - Detective (uncredited)
White Heat (1949) - T-Man Driving Car C (uncredited)
Once More, My Darling (1949) - Inspector (uncredited)
Fighting Man of the Plains (1949) - Bill - Cattleman (uncredited)
Twilight in the Sierras (1950) - Henchman (uncredited)
The Gunfighter (1950) - Third Brother (uncredited)
Bright Leaf (1950) - Devers (uncredited)
David Harding, Counterspy (1950) - McCullough (uncredited)
The Great Jewel Robber (1950) - Joe, Customs Guard (uncredited)
Frenchie (1950) - Man in Assayer's Office (uncredited)
California Passage (1950) - Calhoun (uncredited)
Stage to Tucson (1950) - Sam Granger (uncredited)
Three Guys Named Mike (1951) - Williams - Crew Schedule Man (uncredited)
Oh! Susanna (1951) - Rennie
Katie Did It (1951) - State Trooper (uncredited)
Lightning Strikes Twice (1951) - Policeman at Accident (uncredited)
Snake River Desperadoes (1951) - Dodds (uncredited)
Little Big Horn (1951) - Sgt. Vet McCloud
Government Agents vs. Phantom Legion (1951) - Sam Bradley
The Desert Fox: The Story of Rommel (1951) - German Ski Trooper / Staff Aide (uncredited)
Fixed Bayonets! (1951) - Vic (uncredited)
The Lady Says No (1951) - Minor Role (uncredited)
Trail Guide (1952) - Henchman Dawson
Bugles in the Afternoon (1952) - McDermott (uncredited)
Hoodlum Empire (1952) - Detective (uncredited)
The Sniper (1952) - George Tinman (uncredited)
Red Ball Express (1952) - Major (uncredited)
Sound Off (1952) - Corporal at Induction Center (uncredited)
Glory Alley (1952) - Policeman (uncredited)
Hellgate (1952) - Gundy Boyd
Battle Zone (1952) - Officer (uncredited)
Back at the Front (1952) - Processing Announcer (voice, uncredited)
Operation Secret (1952) - Soldier (uncredited)
Above and Beyond (1952) - Miller
The Blazing Forest (1952) - Helicopter Pilot (uncredited)
The Lawless Breed (1953) - Young Army Lieutenant (uncredited)
The Bandits of Corsica (1953) - Coachman
The Story of Three Loves (1953) - Ship's Officer (segment "Equilibrium") (scenes deleted)
The Charge at Feather River (1953) - Officer (uncredited)
Arrowhead (1953) - John Gunther
Mission Over Korea (1953) - Major McGuire (uncredited)
Fighting Lawman (1953) - Jack Harvey - aka Jack Martin
Crime Wave (1953) - Information Officer (uncredited)
Flight to Tangier (1953) - Hank Brady
Bitter Creek (1954) - Oak Mason - Henchman
Rose Marie (1954) - Orderly (uncredited)
Loophole (1954) - Police Detective / Interrogator (uncredited)
Arrow in the Dust (1954) - Sgt. Lybarger
Massacre Canyon (1954) - Lt. Ridgeford
Black Horse Canyon (1954) - Duke
Return from the Sea (1954) - Spike
Human Desire (1954) - Matt Henley (uncredited)
Two Guns and a Badge (1954) - Sharkey - Outlaw
The Human Jungle (1954) - Examiner (uncredited)
The Bob Mathias Story (1954) - 1948 Olympics Reporter (uncredited)
Seven Angry Men (1955) - George Wilson
Shotgun (1955) - Perez
Kentucky Rifle (1955) - Reuben Hay
Seminole Uprising (1955) - Sgt. Chris Zanoba
Francis in the Navy (1955) - Shore Patrolman (uncredited)
To Hell and Back (1955) - MP (uncredited)
The McConnell Story (1955) - 2nd Military Policeman (uncredited)
I Died a Thousand Times (1955) - Sheriff's Deputy (uncredited)
At Gunpoint (1955) - Alvin Dennis
Flame of the Islands (1956) - Henchman Parks (uncredited)
Inside Detroit (1956) - Blair's U.A.W. Friend (uncredited)
The Lone Ranger (1956) - Sheriff Sam Kimberley
Crime Against Joe (1956) - Harry Dorn - Bartender
The Broken Star (1956) - Van Horn
The Great Locomotive Chase (1956) - Confederate Lt. Fletcher (uncredited)
A Strange Adventure (1956) - Thug (uncredited)
Walk the Proud Land (1956) - Sheriff of Tucson (uncredited)
Away All Boats (1956) - Maj. Scott (uncredited)
Tension at Table Rock (1956) - Cord (uncredited)
Friendly Persuasion (1956) - Ex-Sergeant on Front Line with Josh (uncredited)
The Black Whip (1956) - Sheriff Persons
Three Brave Men (1956) - Naval Investigator (uncredited)
The Night Runner (1957) - Dr. Fisher
War Drums (1957) - Sheriff Bullard
Badlands of Montana (1957) - Vince Branton
The Oklahoman (1957) - Marshal Bill
Outlaw's Son (1957) - Ed Wyatt
Copper Sky (1957) - Trooper Hadley
Ride a Violent Mile (1957) - Marshal James Thorne
The Power of the Resurrection (1958) - Roman Captain (uncredited)
The FBI Story (1959) - Klansman (uncredited)
The Rookie (1959) - Military Policeman (uncredited)
Cimarron (1960) - Ned - Cavalry Captain (uncredited)
Gun Street (1961) - Dr. Knudson
Dangerous Charter (1962) - Police Detective (shot in 1958)
A Gathering of Eagles (1963) - Controller (uncredited)
The Greatest Story Ever Told (1965) - Peter's Accuser #2 (uncredited)
Country Boy (1966) - Claude Springer
Ride to Hangman's Tree (1967) - Pete
Panic in the City (1968) - Williams
Charro! (1969) - Jerome Selby
True Grit (1969) - Frank Ross
Chisum (1970) - Sgt. Braddock
Rape Squad (1974) - Dr. Schetman
The Hindenburg (1975) - Sauter (uncredited)

References

External links

 
 
 
 

1913 births
1993 deaths
American male film actors
United States Navy personnel of World War II
American male television actors
Deaths due to animal attacks in the United States
Male actors from Nashville, Tennessee
United States Navy sailors
Male Western (genre) film actors
20th-century American male actors
People from Rutherford County, Tennessee
Western (genre) television actors